Brittney Exline is the youngest African-American female to be accepted into an Ivy League school, at 15. She went on to become the United States' youngest African-American engineer.

Life
Exline was born on Valentine's Day in Colorado Springs, Colorado to Chyrese and Christopher Exline. Brittney taught herself to read at age 2, and skipped three grades as a youth. She graduated from her high school's International Baccalaureate program. Exline also studied anthropology at Harvard University while in school. She went on to receive a full scholarship to the University of Pennsylvania in 2007 at 15, making her the youngest African-American to be accepted into an Ivy League school. While in college, she majored in engineering. In 2011, at the age of 19, she graduated cum laude with a bachelor's degree in computer science. After graduation, Exline became a software engineer for Chitika, an online advertising network.

Interests 
Exline volunteered with various community-based organizations in Philadelphia. She worked with the Community School Student Partnerhsips in Philadelphia while still at university. She also trained 30 tutors from Penn and worked as a kindergarten summer school teacher for Freedom Schools in Philadelphia, showing her interest in education.

She speaks many languages: English, Spanish, French, Japanese, Russian, Arabic and German.

References

American software engineers
African-American women engineers
American women engineers
African-American engineers
Living people
1992 births
Year of birth uncertain
People from Colorado Springs, Colorado
University of Pennsylvania alumni
21st-century African-American people
21st-century African-American women